Jean-Jacques Meyer (1805–1877) was a French engineer, noted for his work with steam engines and steam locomotives.

Innovations

Background

He was trained at the engineering school Arts et Métiers ParisTech.

Expansion valve
His first major invention was the Meyer expansion valve, used to improve efficiency in stationary steam engines. Named L'Espérance (Hope) and Le Succès (Success), they continued in service for S-B's successor, the Chemins de fer de l'Est until 1859.

Articulated locomotive
He was the originator of the articulated locomotives which bear his name. Meyer registered his first patent describing the system in 1861. The Meyer locomotive comprised: 
 a rigid single frame supporting cabin, and boiler;
 two revolving units like bogies made up each one of a steam engine involving a group of driving wheels and possibly comprising carrying wheels.

The design was developed by Gaston du Bousquet, who designed a class of 0-6-2+2-6-0 tank locomotives for hauling heavy goods trains on the Chemins de fer du Nord and the Chemins de fer de Ceinture de Paris.

Sources
The above information is taken from the French Wikipedia article on the subject.

References

Locomotive builders and designers
French engineers
1805 births
1877 deaths
Arts et Métiers ParisTech alumni